Mammee apple, mamey apple or mammey apple is a common name for several plants which produce edible fruit, and may refer to:

Mammea africana
Mammea americana